Scythris ambustella is a moth of the family Scythrididae. It was described by Bengt Å. Bengtsson in 1997. It is found in Greece.

Etymology
The species name refers to the appearance of the moth and is derived from Latin ambustum (meaning to burn).

References

ambustella
Moths described in 1997